Sadat Ouro-Akoriko (born 1 February 1988) is a Togolese international footballer who plays for ASKO Kara as a centre back.

Club career
Ouro-Akoriko has played club football in Togo and South Africa for Étoile Filante de Lomé, Free State Stars and AmaZulu. On 29 August 2015, he signed a contract for Saudi club Al-Faisaly.

In September 2016, he signed a deal with Al-Khaleej on free transfer after his contract with Al-Faisaly had expired.

In June 2017, he re-joined AmaZulu. He left AmaZulu at the end of his contract in the summer 2019 and joined Kuwaiti club Kazma SC in September 2019.

International career

Ouro-Akoriko made his international debut for Togo in 2010, and has appeared in FIFA World Cup qualifying matches for them.

International goals
Scores and results list Togo's goal tally first.

References

External links
 

1988 births
Living people
People from Sokodé
Togolese footballers
Togo international footballers
Association football defenders
Étoile Filante du Togo players
Free State Stars F.C. players
AmaZulu F.C. players
Al-Faisaly FC players
Khaleej FC players
Kazma SC players
ASKO Kara players
South African Premier Division players
National First Division players
Saudi Professional League players
Togolese expatriate footballers
Expatriate soccer players in South Africa
Expatriate footballers in Saudi Arabia
Expatriate footballers in Kuwait
Togolese expatriate sportspeople in South Africa
Togolese expatriate sportspeople in Saudi Arabia
Togolese expatriate sportspeople in Kuwait
2013 Africa Cup of Nations players
2017 Africa Cup of Nations players
Kuwait Premier League players
21st-century Togolese people